Do the Live is a live album by Do as Infinity, released in 2003.

Track listing

Disc one
 "SUMMER DAYS"
 "under the sun"
 "nice & easy"
 "Desire"
 
 "Good for you"
 "Heart"
 MC
 
 "Yesterday & Today"
 "We are."

Disc two
 MC
 "Grateful Journey"
 
 
 "135"
 "One or Eight"
 
 MC
 
 "Week!"

Chart positions

External links
 Do the Live at Avex Network
 Do the Live at Oricon

Do As Infinity albums
2003 live albums
Avex Group live albums